Isaiah Lehtinen is a Canadian actor. He is most noted for his performance in the 2022 film I Like Movies, for which he won the Vancouver Film Critics Circle award for Best Actor in a Canadian Film at the Vancouver Film Critics Circle Awards 2022.

He has also had supporting or guest roles in the films Freaky Friday and Phil, and the television series Level Up, Deadly Class, Family Law and Pretty Hard Cases.

References

External links

21st-century Canadian male actors
Canadian male film actors
Canadian male television actors
Living people